The Buhl A-1 Autogiro was an autogyro optimised for air camera work designed and built from 1930. To this end, Etienne Dormoy designed the Buhl A-1, an autogyro with a pusher engine located behind the pilot and camera operator. The Buhl A-1 was the first pusher style autogyro.

Specifications

See also

References

External links

 The Buhl A-1 Autogiro

Bull A-1
Single-engined pusher autogyros
1930s United States experimental aircraft
Low-wing aircraft
Aircraft first flown in 1931